Spinning is a brand of indoor bicycles and indoor cycling instruction classes distributed and licensed by the American health and fitness company Mad Dogg Athletics. Launched in 1993, the brand has become a popular term to refer to indoor bicycles and indoor cycling fitness classes in the United States and throughout the world.

History
The Spinning indoor cycling program was developed by South African endurance bicycle racer Johnny Goldberg (known as Johnny G) in the mid-1980s after he was struck by a car while training for a race at night. Goldberg's early Spinning prototypes were targeted toward endurance athletes as a substitute for outdoor bicycle training, and allowed the athlete to train year-round regardless of outdoor weather conditions.

In 1989 Goldberg opened the Johnny G Spinning Center, in Santa Monica, California, with bikes he built. In 1992 he moved the class to Karen Voight Fitness, in Hollywood, for more exposure. In 1993 Goldberg and his business partner, cycling enthusiast John Baudhuin, launched the Spinning indoor cycling fitness program in Santa Monica, California, through their business entity Mad Dogg Athletics, Inc. The first Spinning brand indoor cycling programs were held in Crunch gyms in New York, but were only regionally popular at that time. By 1994, however, Spinning made national news on Rolling Stone Magazine’s “hot list as the ‘hot exercise’ you need to try.” 

Goldberg and Baudhuin made a deal with Schwinn, which debuted bikes at a trade show in 1995. The Spinning program expanded in the United States and worldwide. By 1996 there were more than a thousand Official Spinning Facilities spanning over 30 countries. Goldberg and Baudhuin trained thousands of instructors. “It was unique—the first time equipment, training, and philosophy was sold together,” Goldberg said in 2004.

In 2003 Star Trac became the bike manufacturer. In 2004 Goldberg retired from Mad Dogg Athletics and the Spinning brand.

In 2015 Mad Dogg Athletics partnered with Precor to create a new line of commercial Spinner bikes. 

Mad Dogg Athletics has trained over 200,000 instructors in its Spinning program and has a network of over 35,000 fitness facilities.

Mad Dogg Athletics claims trademark ownership for the terms Spin, Spinner, Spinning, Spin Fitness, SPINPower, and the Spinning logo, among others.

Possible generic term
Spinning has, arguably, become a generic term in the United States, and a generic term cannot function as a trademark. However, Mad Dogg Athletics has registered Spinning as a trademark on the Principal Register of the United States Patent and Trademark Office. A registration on the Principal Register does not create ownership rights under the laws of the United States, and a registration may be challenged and removed if the challenger proves as a matter of fact that the alleged trademark has become generic.

Mad Dogg Athletics continues to defend the Spinning trademark against its generic use and has recently expanded its focus and efforts on brand protection.

Based on the brand's widespread popularity, it has potentially become a generic term for indoor cycling in the Czech Republic. However, in November 2018, the General Court (European Union) upheld Mad Dogg's rights and found that the brand was not a generic term.

Related products
To protect its trademark for the term Spinning, Mad Dogg Athletics commonly refers to its products and services as the "SPINNING brand", "SPINNING indoor cycling", "SPINNING certification", and similar terms, not just "Spinning".

See also 

 CrossFit, a comparable American brand and potentially genericized trademark.

References

Exercise equipment
Cycle retailers
Brands that became generic